Max Vladimirovich Alpert (18 March 1899 – 30 November 1980) was a prominent Soviet photographer who was mostly known for his frontline work during World War II.

Biography
Before World War I, Alpert studied in Odessa, together with his brother Mikhail Alperin, and after the war worked as a photographer for Rabochaya Gazeta (Workers Newspaper) in Moscow. In the 1930s, he photographed numerous construction sites of the Soviet Union. During that time, Sergei Eisenstein stayed with him at the Great Fergana Canal and was impressed by his passion for photography. In parallel, Alpert worked for Pravda, where he was known as a prolific portrait photographer. During World War II, he took a number of iconic photographs at the Soviet frontlines and also documented military events in Prague and Berlin. For his work during the war, he was awarded the Order of the Red Star (1943), the Order of the Patriotic War (1945) and the Order of the Red Banner of Labour. After the war, he worked at RIA Novosti, where he compiled a famous photo album of Nikolai Amosov. Examples of his images are held in the Sovfoto archive.

Gallery

References

1899 births
1980 deaths
Artists from Simferopol
Recipients of the Order of the Red Banner of Labour
Recipients of the Order of the Red Star
Soviet photographers
World War II photographers